Sarukhetri Assembly constituency is one of the 126 assembly constituencies of Assam Legislative Assembly. Sarukhetri forms part of the Barpeta Lok Sabha constituency.

Members of Legislative Assembly 
 1967: M. Nayak, Independent
 1972: Kandarpa Kumar Das, Indian National Congress
 1978: Sirajul Haque, Independent
 1983: Amir Hamcha Talukdar, Indian National Congress
 1985: Dinabandhu Choudhary, Independent
 1991: Nizamuddin Khan, Communist Party of India (Marxist)
 1996: Nizamuddin Khan, Communist Party of India (Marxist)
 2001: Dr. Tara Prasad Das, Independent
 2006: Dr. Tara Prasad Das, Independent
 2011: Ali Hossain, All India United Democratic Front
 2016: Jakir Hussain Sikdar, Indian National Congress
 2021: Jakir Hussain Sikdar, Indian National Congress

Election results

2021 result

2016 result

References

External links 
 

Assembly constituencies of Assam